The men's 20 kilometres walk event at the 2009 Summer Universiade was held on 9 July.

Results

References

Results (archived)

Walk
2009 in women's athletics
2009